Ken DeBauche (born September 26, 1984) from Suamico, Wisconsin is a former American football punter.  Ken signed with the Green Bay Packers as an undrafted free agent in April 2008 and subsequently released on July 24, 2008. He played college football at Wisconsin as #94 and was a team captain for the Badgers in his senior season.

Ken attended Green Bay area high school Bay Port High School, in Suamico. Ken was a three-sport athlete playing football, basketball, and baseball during his high school career. His younger brother Brad DeBauche was also a punter for the Badgers from 2007-2009.

He was married on July 10, 2010, to Caroline Hoesly in Brookfield, Wisconsin.

Ken's parents are Jean and Steve DeBauche of Suamico, WI and has two younger brothers, Brad and Brent DeBauche.

As of 2008 Ken was employed at Franklin Energy Services.  Every October, Kenny DeBauche Day is celebrated at the Port Washington office.

High School career
DeBauche was a 3-sport (football, basketball, baseball) athlete at Bay Port High School in  Suamico, Wisconsin.

College career
DeBauche holds the University of Wisconsin single season punting record at 44.8 yards per punt and is also second in career average behind Kevin Stemke.

Ken was voted as the Badgers Special Teams player of the year as a freshman in 2004 and was voted Big Ten Special Teams player of the Week numerous times throughout his career.

DeBauche was a 3-time All-Big Ten performer and Second Team All-American in 2005.

"Taylor Mehlhaff teamed with punter Ken DeBauche to form what many experts felt was the best kicking tandem in college football in recent years."  -NFLDraftScout.com

References

External links
Green Bay Packers bio
 Fake punt pass to Paul Standring video 

1984 births
Living people
People from Suamico, Wisconsin
American football punters
Wisconsin Badgers football players